Ringkøbing-Skjern municipality is the largest municipality (Danish, kommune) in Denmark. It was formed on 1 January 2007 as part of the 2007 administrative reform from the former municipalities of Egvad, Holmsland, Ringkøbing, Skjern, and Videbæk. The total population was 56,203 (1. January 2022) with a population density of 38 per square km. It is part of Region Midtjylland ("Region Central Jutland"), also known as the Central Denmark Region. The Mayor of the Municipality since 2018 is Hans Østergaard (Venstre).

The Church of Denmark has 46 parishes in the municipality.

Locations

Politics

Municipal council
Ringkøbing-Skjern's municipal council consists of 29 members, elected every four years.

Below are the municipal councils elected since the Municipal Reform of 2007.

See also 
Hoven, Denmark

References 
 
 Municipal statistics: NetBorger Kommunefakta, delivered from KMD aka Kommunedata (Municipal Data)
 Municipal mergers and neighbors: Eniro new municipalities map

External links 

 
 The Ringkøbing Fjord area's official cooperation and tourism information website

 
Municipalities of the Central Denmark Region
Municipalities of Denmark
Populated places established in 2007